Corinna Dentoni (born 30 July 1989) is an inactive Italian tennis player.

On 22 June 2009, she achieved her best WTA singles ranking of 132. Her career-high in doubles is world No. 151, which she reached on 25 May 2009.

Dentoni has won nine singles and six doubles titles on tournaments of the ITF Women's Circuit.

Biography
Father played volleyball in Italian league; both parents are retired. Started playing at age seven because her best friend played tennis. She has been training in Rome. Favorite surface is clay, her favorite tournament is French Open. Her tennis idol was Kim Clijsters.

ITF Circuit finals

Singles: 16 (9 titles, 7 runner–ups)

Doubles: 12 (6 titles, 6 runner–ups)

External links

 
 

1989 births
Living people
People from Pietrasanta
Italian female tennis players
Sportspeople from the Province of Lucca
21st-century Italian women